South-Eastern District was a district command of the British Army from the mid-19th century until 1903. It was in existence again between 1967 and 1995.

History

Early formation
Historically troops based in the South-Eastern counties had reported direct to Army Headquarters in London but in July 1856 South-Eastern District was formed under Lieutenant-General Sir Colin Campbell. Campbell was recalled to become Commander-in-Chief, India just three months later and Lieutenant-General Sir Frederick Love was appointed to the command in his place. The headquarters of the command was established at Dover Castle.

Re-formation
The district was formed from Aldershot Command as part of the Territorial Army Volunteer Reserve in 1967. It had its headquarters at Aldershot Garrison, and was placed under the command of HQ UK Land Forces in 1972. It was disbanded again on the formation of HQ Land Command in 1995.

Commanders
General officers commanding included:
South-Eastern District
July-September 1856 Lieutenant-General Sir Colin Campbell
1856-1857 Lieutenant-General Sir Frederick Love
1857-1861 Lieutenant-General Robert Mansel
1861-1865 Lieutenant-General the Hon. Arthur Dalzell
1865-1866 Lieutenant-General Sir Robert Garrett
1866-1867 Major-General William McCleverty
1867-1868 Major-General Charles Ellice
1868-1872 Lieutenant-General Sir David Russell
1872-1874 Major-General Sir Alfred Horsford
1874-1877 Major-General William Parke
1877-1880 Lieutenant-General Lord Alexander Russell
1880-1885 Major-General Edward Newdigate
1885-1887 Lieutenant-General the Hon. Percy Feilding
1887-1891 Major-General Alexander Montgomery Moore
1891-1896 Major-General Lord William Seymour
1896-1898 Major-General Sir William Butler
1898-1899 Major-General Leslie Rundle
1899-1902 Major-General Henry Hallam Parr
1902-1903 Major-General Leslie Rundle

South East District
1967-1969 Major-General Charles Stainforth
1969-1972 Major-General Bernard Penfold
1972 Lieutenant-General Sir Allan Taylor
1972-1974 Lieutenant-General Sir Terence McMeekin
1974-1977 Lieutenant-General Sir James Wilson
1977-1979 Lieutenant-General Sir Anthony Farrar-Hockley
1979-1981 Lieutenant-General Sir George Cooper
1981-1982 Lieutenant-General Sir Paul Travers
1982-1983 Lieutenant-General Sir Richard Trant
1983-1985 Lieutenant-General Sir Geoffrey Howlett
1985-1988 Lieutenant-General Sir Michael Gray
1988-1990 Lieutenant-General Sir Peter de la Billière
1990-1994 Lieutenant-General Sir Richard Swinburn
Southern District
1994-1995 Lieutenant-General Sir Anthony Denison-Smith

References

Districts of the British Army
Military units and formations established in 1856
Military units and formations disestablished in 1903
Military units and formations established in 1972
Military units and formations disestablished in 1995